Tracy J. Phillips is a former New Zealand athlete specialising in high jumping.

She competed for New Zealand in the 1990 Commonwealth Games, winning a bronze.

At the 1994 Commonwealth Games she came ninth with 1.80m.

References 
 Athletes at the Games by John Clark, page 99 (1998, Athletics New Zealand) 
 Profile at NZOGC website

Athletes (track and field) at the 1990 Commonwealth Games
Athletes (track and field) at the 1994 Commonwealth Games
Commonwealth Games bronze medallists for New Zealand
New Zealand female high jumpers
Commonwealth Games medallists in athletics
Living people
Year of birth missing (living people)
Medallists at the 1990 Commonwealth Games